Jacques Van Aalten (April 12, 1907 – May 24, 1997) was an American artist.

Life
He was born in Antwerp, Belgium.
He studied at Grande Chaumiere, National Academy of Design, and the Art Students League of New York.
He was a member of the Federal Art Project.

He married Mimi Van Aalten; they lived in New Orleans, from 1950 to 1972.
They moved to Florida in 1972.
He is buried in Broward County, Florida.

References

External links

http://www.artnet.com/artists/jacques-van-aalten/past-auction-results
http://www.askart.com/askart/v/jacques_van_aalten/jacques_van_aalten.aspx

1907 births
1997 deaths
Belgian emigrants to the United States
Federal Art Project artists
Painters from Antwerp